Zoë Porphyrogenita (  "life";  978 – 1050) was a member of the Macedonian dynasty who briefly reigned as Byzantine Empress in 1042, alongside her sister Theodora. Before that she was enthroned as empress consort to a series of co-rulers, two of whom were married to her.

Zoë was born when her father Constantine was nominal co-emperor to his brother, Basil II. After a marriage to Holy Roman Emperor Otto III in 996 failed to materialise, Zoë spent subsequent years in the imperial palace. Basil died in 1025 when Zoë was 47, and her father acceeded the Byzantine throne as Constantine VIII. As he had no sons, Constantine hoped to continue the dynasty by marrying off one of his daughters. Zoë, aged 50, was married to Romanos Argyros. They took the throne the next day on her father's death.

The marriage of Zoë and Romanos III was troubled, and Romanos was found dead in his bath in 1034. His death has been variously attributed to Zoë, her young lover, or both. They were married on the same day as the supposed murder, and he was crowned Emperor Michael IV on the following day. In 1041, Zoë was persuaded to adopt her dying husband's nephew, Michael Kalaphates. Once Michael V became emperor, he promptly exiled Zoë. This action sparked a popular revolt which dethroned him and installed Zoë and her sister Theodora as joint empresses. After a two-month joint reign, Zoë married a former lover who was installed as Constantine IX, transferring power to him. However, she continued to rule the empire as its heir and as the Byzantine empress. Eight years later, Zoë died aged 72. Her reign saw the decline of the Roman army, and the first incursions by the Turks into eastern Anatolia.

Early life:  978–1028

Zoë was Porphyrogenita, "born into the purple"; this was the appellation for a child born in the capital to a reigning emperor. She was the second daughter of Constantine VIII and his wife Helena. Her father had become co-emperor, at the age of two, in 962. His brother Basil II, the senior co-ruler, prevented his nieces from marrying any of the Byzantine nobility, as this would have given their husbands a claim on the imperial throne. As women they were unable to exercise any state authority; their only say in this was in choosing, or more likely accepting or not, a husband who would acquire their authority upon marriage. Consequently, Zoë lived a life of virtual obscurity in the imperial gynaeceum (women's quarters) for many years.

As an eligible imperial princess Zoë was considered a possible bride for the Holy Roman Emperor, Otto III, in 996. A second embassy sent in 1001, headed by Arnulf II, Archbishop of Milan, was tasked with selecting Otto's bride from among Constantine's three daughters. The eldest, Eudocia, was disfigured by smallpox, while the youngest, Theodora, was a very plain girl. Arnulf, therefore, selected the attractive 23-year-old Zoë, to which Basil II agreed. In January 1002 she accompanied Arnulf back to Italy, only to discover when the ship reached Bari that Otto had died, forcing her to return home.

When Basil II died, Constantine VIII took the throne. His reign as sole emperor lasted less than three years, from 15 December 1025 to 11 November 1028. Another opportunity for Zoë to marry arose in 1028 when an embassy from the Holy Roman Empire arrived in Constantinople with a proposal for an imperial marriage. Constantine and Zoë rejected the idea out of hand when it was revealed that the intended groom, Henry, the son of Conrad II, was only ten years old. Constantine determined that the ruling house would be continued by one of his daughters being married to an appropriate aristocrat. The first potential match was the distinguished noble Constantine Dalassenos, the former dux of Antioch. The emperor's advisors preferred a weak ruler whom they could control and they persuaded him to reject Dalassenos after he had already been summoned to the capital. Romanos Argyros, the urban prefect of Constantinople, was the next to be considered as a match. Theodora defied her father by refusing to marry Romanos, arguing that he was already marriedhis wife having been forced to become a nun to allow Romanos to marry into the imperial familyand that as third cousins they had too close a blood relationship for marriage to occur. Consequently, Constantine VIII chose Zoë to be Romanos's wife. Zoe and Romanos married on 10 November 1028 in the imperial chapel of the palace. The next day Constantine died and the newlyweds were seated on the imperial throne.

From Romanos III to Michael V: 1028–1042

Spending years in the same restrictive quarters with her sister, Zoë had come to loathe Theodora. Zoë convinced Romanos to appoint one of his own men as the chief of Theodora's household, with orders to spy on her. Shortly afterwards, Theodora was accused of plotting to usurp the throne, first with Presian in 1030, followed by Constantine Diogenes, the governor of Sirmium, in 1031. Zoë accused her of being part of the conspiracy, and Theodora was forcibly confined in the monastery of Petrion. Zoë later visited her sister and forced her to take religious vows.

Zoë was obsessed with continuing the Macedonian dynasty. Almost immediately upon marrying Romanos the fifty-year-old Zoë tried desperately to become pregnant. She used magic charms, amulets, and potions, all without effect. This failure to conceive helped alienate the couple, and soon Romanos refused to share the marriage bed with her. Romanos limited his wife's spending and paid her little attention.

Zoë, furious and frustrated, engaged in a number of affairs. Romanos tolerated these and took a mistress himself. In 1033 Zoë became enamoured of a low-born servant called Michael. She flaunted her lover openly and spoke about making him emperor. Rumours of her conduct led Romanos to confront Michael, who denied aspiring to the throne.

In early 1034 Romanos became ill and it was widely believed that Zoë and Michael were conspiring to have him poisoned. On 11 April Romanos was found dying in his bath. According to court official and later chronicler Michael Psellus some of his retinue had "held his head for a long time beneath the water, attempting at the same time to strangle him". John Scylitzes writes as a simple fact that Romanos was drowned on Michael's orders. Matthew of Edessa's account has Zoë poisoning Romanos.

Zoë and Michael were married on the same day that Romanos III died. The next day they summoned the Patriarch Alexios I to officiate at the coronation of the new emperor. Although he initially refused to co-operate, the payment of 50 pounds of gold helped change his mind. Zoë's new husband took power as Michael IV. His abrupt rise to power had left him unprepared to rule, and he delegated much of the business of governing to his brother, the eunuch John the Orphanotrophos. 

Although Zoë believed Michael would prove to be a more devoted husband than Romanos, she was mistaken. Fearing that Zoë would turn on him as she had turned on his predecessor, Michael excluded her from politics and sent her back to the gynaeceum, where she was kept under strict surveillance. The disgruntled empress tried to alter the balance of power by conspiring against John, without success.

Michael's health was bad throughout his reign, and by 1041 it was obvious that he was dying. Eager to ensure that power remained in his hands, John the Eunuch forced Zoë to adopt his nephew Michael Kalaphates. On 10 December 1041, Michael IV died, refusing to the last to see his wife who begged that she be allowed to visit him one more time. Kalaphates was crowned emperor as Michael V.

Although he had pledged to respect Zoë, Michael V promptly banished her to a monastery on Principus, an island in the Sea of Marmara, on charges of attempted regicide. She was forcibly tonsured and sworn into a religious order. This treatment of the legitimate heir to the Macedonian Dynasty caused a popular uprising in Constantinople. Michael V, desperate to keep his throne, brought Zoë back from Principus and displayed her to the people, but his insistence that he continue to rule alongside her was in vain. On 19 April 1042, the mob revolted against Michael V in support of not only Zoë but also Theodora.

A delegation headed by Patrician Constantine Cabasilas went to the monastery at Petrion to convince Theodora to become co-empress alongside her sister. Theodora had become accustomed to a life of religious contemplation and tried to refuse the proposal, but the delegates brought her forcibly back to the capital. At an assembly in Hagia Sophia the people escorted a furious Theodora and proclaimed her empress along with Zoë. They were both crowned on 21 April and Michael V was forced to take refuge in a monastery.

Ruling with Theodora and Constantine IX: 1042–1050
Zoë immediately assumed power and tried to force Theodora back to her monastery, but the Senate and the people demanded that the sisters should jointly reign. As her first act Theodora was called upon to deal with Michael V. Zoë wanted to pardon and free Michael, but Theodora was clear and adamant. She initially guaranteed Michael's safety, but then ordered him to be blinded and to spend the rest of his life as a monk.

Officially Zoë was the senior empress, and her throne was situated slightly in front of Theodora's on all public occasions. In practice Theodora was the driving force behind the joint administration. The sisters proceeded to administer the empire, focusing on curbing the sale of public offices and on the administration of justice. Although contemporary historian Michael Psellus claimed the joint reign was a complete failure, John Scylitzes stated that they were very conscientious in rectifying the abuses of the previous reigns.

Theodora and Zoë appeared together at meetings of the Senate and gave public audiences, but it was soon apparent that their joint reign was under strain. Zoë was still jealous of Theodora and had no desire to administer the empire; but she would not allow Theodora to conduct public business alone. The court began to split, with factions forming behind each empress. After two months of increasing acrimony, Zoë decided to search for a new husbandthereby denying Theodora the opportunity to increase her influence. By the rules of the Orthodox Church her next marriage, her third, was the last she was permitted.

Her preference was for Constantine Dalassenos, who had been her father's first choice as her husband back in 1028. He was brought for an audience before the Empress, but during their conversation his independent and forceful manner displeased Zoe, and he was dismissed from her presence. Her next choice was the married Constantine Atroklines, a court official with whom it was rumoured that she had had an affair during the reign of Romanos III. He died under mysterious circumstances a few days before the wedding was to take place, possibly poisoned by his own soon to be ex-wife.

Zoë then remembered the handsome and urbane Constantine Monomachos, another former lover. The pair were married on 11 June 1042, without the participation of Patriarch Alexios, who refused to officiate over a third marriage (for both spouses). Constantine was crowned by the patriarch the next day.

Zoë got more than she bargained for when Constantine decided to bring with him to his new station his long-standing mistress Maria Skleraina. Not content with bringing her to court, he insisted that he be allowed to publicly share his life with her, and that she obtain some official recognition. The 64-year-old Zoë did not object to sharing her bed and her throne with Skleraina. Skleraina was given the title of sebaste, ranking behind Zoë and Theodora, and was addressed as mistress or empress, like them. At official events Skleraina took position immediately behind the sisters.

In the eyes of the public however, Constantine IX's preferential treatment of Skleraina was a scandal, and eventually rumours began to spread that Skleraina was planning to murder Zoë, and possibly Theodora. This led to a popular uprising by the citizens of Constantinople in 1044, which came dangerously close to actually harming Constantine who was participating in a religious procession along the streets of Constantinople. The mob was only quieted by the appearance on a balcony of Zoë and Theodora, who reassured the people that they were not in any danger of assassination.

It is said that Zoë was stunningly beautiful, and Michael Psellos in his Chronographia commented that "every part of her was firm and in good condition". Zoë recognised her own beauty and its use as a tool of statecraft. Attempting to maximise and prolong its effect she had a variety of creams and treatments prepared in the gynaeceum, and was said to have carried out experiments attempting to improve their efficacy. She operated a cosmetics laboratory in her rooms in the palace, where perfumes and unguents were constantly being prepared. Psellus reports that her face looked youthful into her sixties. Zoë died in 1050, aged 72. She was buried in Constantinople.

See also

List of Byzantine emperors

References

Sources

Primary sources

Secondary sources
 
 
 
 
 
 
 
 
 

970s births
1050 deaths
Macedonian dynasty
11th-century Byzantine emperors
10th-century Byzantine women
11th-century Byzantine empresses
Remarried royal consorts
Byzantine Empresses regnant
Porphyrogennetoi
Burials at the Church of the Holy Apostles
1040s in the Byzantine Empire
11th-century women rulers